Empire Barracuda was a  cargo ship which was built in 1918 for the United States Shipping Board (USSB) as Sacandaga. She was sold to American Diamond Lines in 1932 and renamed Black Heron. In 1941 she passed to the Ministry of War Transport (MoWT) and was renamed Empire Barracuda. She was torpedoed on 15 December 1942 and sunk by U-77.

History
Sacandaga was built by American International Shipbuilding Co, Hog Island, Philadelphia, Pennsylvania as yard number 494. She was laid down on 20 March 1918, launched on 20 October 1918 and completed on 12 January 1919. She was built for the USSB, but was sold in 1919 to the Carolina Co, and placed under the management of American Palmetto Line. In 1925 she was returned to the ownership of the USSB. In 1931, she was sold to American Diamond Lines Inc and in 1932 Sacandaga was renamed Black Heron. In 1939, Black Heron was serving Baltimore, Boston, Newport News, New York, and Norfolk in the United States and Antwerp, in Belgium with Amsterdam and Rotterdam in the Netherlands.

War service
On 10 January 1941, a fire broke out aboard Black Heron whilst she was moored at Brooklyn Pier, New York. Although some mattresses and medical supplies were destroyed, three bombers being carried were undamaged. In 1941, Black Heron was transferred to the MoWT and renamed Empire Barracuda. Her port of registry was London and she was placed under the management of Cunard White Star Line Ltd. Empire Barracuda was a member of a number of convoys in the Second World War.

OB 297

Convoy OB 297 sailed from Liverpool on 12 March 1941 and dispersed at sea on 17 March. Empire Barracuda was in ballast and bound for Corpus Christi, Texas.

ON 9

Convoy ON 9 which sailed from Liverpool on 20 August 1941 and dispersed at sea on 25 August. Empire Barracuda was bound for New York.

HX 151

Convoy HX 151 sailed from Halifax, Nova Scotia on 22 September 1941 and arrived at Liverpool on 7 October.

OS 11

Convoy OS 11 sailed from Liverpool on 7 November 1941 and arrived at Freetown, Sierra Leone on 21 November. Empire Barracuda was carrying a cargo of stores, outbound from the Clyde and her final destination was Gibraltar.

Sinking
On 15 December 1941, Empire Barracuda was torpedoed by U-77 under the command of Heinrich Schonder and sunk at  while on a voyage from Gibraltar to Cape Town and Suez. Nine crew members and four DEMS gunners were killed. Those lost on Empire Barracuda are commemorated at the Tower Hill Memorial, London.

Propulsion
She could make .

Official number and code letters
Official Numbers were a forerunner to IMO Numbers. Sacandaga and Black Heron had the US Official Number 217429. Empire Barracuda had the UK Official Number 168073 and used the Code Letters GNPP.

References

Hog Islanders
1918 ships
Steamships of the United States
Merchant ships of the United States
Steamships of the United Kingdom
Design 1022 ships of the Ministry of War Transport
Ships sunk by German submarines in World War II
World War II shipwrecks in the Atlantic Ocean
Maritime incidents in December 1941